Jennifer Willems (13 August 1947 – 13 November 2015) was a Dutch actress, well known in film and television, particularly for her role in the children's television series De film van ome Willem (1974-1989). Her other notable roles included the ones in the films Naked Over the Fence (1974) and Keetje Tippel (1975).

Selected filmography
The Burglar (1972)
Naked Over the Fence (1973)
Het Jaar van de Kreeft (1975)
Keetje Tippel (1975)

References

1947 births
2015 deaths
Dutch film actresses
Dutch television actresses
20th-century Dutch actresses
Actresses from The Hague
Place of death missing